Kim Jin-myong (born 5 November 1972) is a North Korean table tennis coach and former player. He competed in men's doubles at the 1992 Summer Olympics with Kim Song-hui.

He has been coaching the North Korean women's national team since around 2012.

References

Table tennis coaches
North Korean male table tennis players
Table tennis players at the 1992 Summer Olympics
Olympic table tennis players of North Korea
1972 births
Living people
20th-century North Korean people